George Albert Hartland (14 July 1884 – 18 July 1944) was a British Conservative Party politician. He was a Member of Parliament (MP) for Norwich from 1931 to 1935. He was educated at St. Francis Xavier's College, Liverpool. He served with the Liverpool Scottish during the First World War.

References

External links 
 

1884 births
1944 deaths
Liverpool Scottish soldiers
UK MPs 1931–1935
Conservative Party (UK) MPs for English constituencies
British Army personnel of World War I
Members of the Parliament of the United Kingdom for Norwich